Wailaki, also known as Eel River, is an extinct Athabaskan language spoken by the people of the Round Valley Reservation of northern California, one of four languages belonging to the California Athabaskan cluster of the Pacific Coast Athabaskan languages. Dialect clusters reflect the four Wailaki-speaking peoples, the Sinkyone, Wailaki, Nongatl, and Lassik, of the Eel River confederation.

Phonology
The sounds in Wailaki:

Consonants

Vowels 
Vowels in Wailaki are /i e a o/, and with length as /iː eː aː oː/.

References

External links
 Wailaki language overview at the Survey of California and Other Indian Languages
 Wailaki Language (Sinkyone, Lassik, Nongatl, Eel River Athabaskan)
 OLAC resources in and about the Wailaki language
 Wailaki at the California Language Archive

Indigenous languages of California
Pacific Coast Athabaskan languages
Eel River Athapaskan peoples